Jaroslav Janda (born 17 October 1942) is a Czech alpine skier. He competed in three events at the 1968 Winter Olympics.

References

1942 births
Living people
Czech male alpine skiers
Olympic alpine skiers of Czechoslovakia
Alpine skiers at the 1968 Winter Olympics
Sportspeople from Jablonec nad Nisou